Darkala-ye Olya (also Romanized as Dārkalā-ye ‘Olyā; also known as Dārkalā) is a village in Kelarestaq-e Sharqi Rural District, in the Central District of Chalus County, Mazandaran Province, Iran. At the 2006 census, its population was 671, in 175 families.

References 

Populated places in Chalus County